William X (Occitan: Guillém X; 1099 – 9 April 1137), called the Saint, was Duke of Aquitaine, Duke of Gascony, and Count of Poitou (as William VIII) from 1126 to 1137.

Early life
William was the son of William IX by his second wife, Philippa of Toulouse. He was born in Toulouse during the brief period when his parents ruled the capital. His birth is recorded in the Chronicle of Saint-Maixent for the year 1099:  ('a son was born to Count William, named William like himself'). Later that same year, much to Philippa's ire, Duke William IX mortgaged Toulouse to Philippa's cousin, Bertrand of Toulouse, and then left on crusade.

William and his mother, Philippa, were left in Poitiers. When his father, William IX returned from his unsuccessful crusade, he took up with Dangerose, the wife of a vassal, and set aside his rightful wife, Philippa. This caused strain between father and son until 1121 when William X married Aenor de Châtellerault, a daughter of his father's mistress Dangerose by her first husband, Aimery. William succeeded to the duchy of Aquitaine in 1126.

Marriage & Issue
William and Aenor had:
Eleanor, who later became heiress to the Duchy and is best known to history as Eleanor of Aquitaine;
Petronilla, who married Raoul I of Vermandois
William Aigret, who died at age 4 in 1130, about the time their mother Aenor de Châtellerault died.

Duke
William administered his Aquitaine duchy as both a lover of the arts and a warrior. He became involved in conflicts with Normandy, which he raided in 1136 in alliance with Geoffrey V, Count of Anjou, who claimed it in his wife's name and for France.

Even inside his borders, William faced an alliance of the Lusignans and the Parthenays against him, an issue resolved with total destruction of the enemies. In international politics, William X initially supported antipope Anacletus II in the papal schism of 1130, opposite to Pope Innocent II, against the will of his own bishops. In 1134, Saint Bernard of Clairvaux convinced William to drop his support for Anacletus and join Innocent.

In 1137, William joined the pilgrimage to Santiago de Compostela, but died during the trip. On his deathbed, he expressed his wish to see king Louis VI of France as protector of his fifteen-year-old daughter Eleanor, and to find her a suitable husband. Louis VI naturally accepted this guardianship and married the heiress of Aquitaine to his own son, Louis VII.

See also
Dukes of Aquitaine family tree

References

Sources

Dukes of Aquitaine
House of Poitiers
French patrons of literature
Occitan nobility
1099 births
1137 deaths